Dahanayakage Nihal Ranjith Silva (Sinhala:නිහාල් සිල්වා) (10 January 1954 – 3 December 1989), popularly known as Nihal Silva, was a Sri Lankan comedian and actor. He rose to fame playing Sargeant  Nallathambi in the play of the same name. The character was a stereotypical Tamil Hindu with a bald head, small moustache, police suit and Vibhuti, three lines of ash, on his forehead.

Personal life
Silva was born on January 10, 1954, in Kirilapone and grew up in Nuwara Eliya, Sri Lanka as the youngest of the family. His father was Dahanayakage Andrew De Silva, who worked in Railway Department. His mother was Wataketiya Rajapaksage Lucyhami. She worked as a hospital attendant. Silva has three elder sisters, Malini, Shriyawathi and Padmini and three elder brothers, Nimal, Siripala. Silva educated at Sri Waishaka Vidyalaya, Wellawatte and Sri Watawala Maha Vidyalaya, Hatton.

Death
Silva was shot to death by Sri Lanka Army soldiers as he ignored warnings and ran a checkpoint on December 3, 1989, in Dehiwela; he possibly did not understand the situation due to inebriation.

Career
Nihal first acted in the 1975 Vesak drama, Desha Drohiya directed by Asoka Senarath Mudali for the Kirulapone Pradeshiya Sabha Youth Union. 
Asoka Senarath Mudalige was given the opportunity to perform for the first time on a public stage. He played the father of two other friends Raja and Jinadasa in the drama Mehve Rate. He was in the police station when Premadasa Hettigoda produced a play Bahukolam Sohon Bere. He subsequently had roles in stage plays like Amal Biso, Ambalamaka Nade and Le Kandulu. 

His maiden cinema acting came through 1974 film Hadawath Naththo with an uncredited role in a dance troop. Nihal has been given the opportunity to act in a movie as a character in the 1980 film Jodu Walalu directed by S. Dayananda's with a role of Tamil garden watcher. Nihal played the role "Maddume" in the film Kadira, which has influenced to give the opportunity to play a character in the film Rosy by director Yasapalitha Nanayakkara. Then he acted in many commercially successful films such as Sathweni Dawasa, Ahimi Dadayama, Kawuluwa and Kiri Madu Wal.

Nihal first worked as a drama producer in the play Sathuro directed by Jayasekara Aponsu. Then he produced the play Sabhawaniya Kaakko where Australian actor John Musso is also acted in the play. Nihal subsequently produced Rudira Wanija drama and then worked in Kawuruth Enne Nehe and Ayith Ithin Heta produced by Pathiraja L. S. Dayananda. Some of his notable stage drama acting came through Punthila and Ran Salakuna. He first played Sajan  Nallathambi in the play Neinage Suduwa by Daya Wayaman in 1985. The play Sajan  Nallathambi was one of the first Sri Lankan plays to be a financial success. It was hugely popular, even playing in the Middle East to Sinhala audiences with successful 366 shows. After its run, a slew of similar comedies like Ralla, Commando Diyasena, and Vadamaarachi appeared in Sri Lankan theaters inspired by its success.

Filmography
 No. denotes the Number of Sri Lankan film in the Sri Lankan cinema.

References

External links
Nihal Silva's Biography in Sinhala Cinema Database

1954 births
1989 deaths
Deaths by firearm in Sri Lanka
Sri Lankan murder victims
People murdered in Sri Lanka
Sri Lankan male film actors
Sinhalese male actors
20th-century Sri Lankan male actors